Kodiyettru Thirunal is the festival celebrated in Swamithoppepathi for eleven days by the followers of the Ayyavazhi. This is celebrated three times annually during the Tamil months of Aavani, Thai and Vaikaasi. The festival for the month of Vaikasi is considered the most sacred and is celebrated in a grand scale. 

The festival starts on the first Friday of Avani and Thai. In Vaikasi, the festival begins on the second Friday of the month. The festival starts with the hoisting of the Saffron coloured holy Flag, early in the morning. In the evening the elunetru is carried around the Pathi and through the four car streets in Vahanas.

Vahanas

Day one - Thottil Vahana
Day two - Chair Vahana
Day three - Swan Vahana
Day four - Chapira Vahana
Day five - Chapira Vahana
Day six - Naga Vahana
Day seven - Garuda Vahana
Day eight - Horse Vahana
Day nine - Hanuman Vahana
Day ten - Indra Vahana
Day eleven - Temple Car

See also

 Swamithope pathi
 Pathi

References
 G. Patrick, Religion and Subaltern Agency, University of Madras, 2003.
 C. Thamizhraj, Ayya Thunai, Monthly, 4 March 2003.

Ayyavazhi